Zhang Chujin (died 922) was a ruler of Chengde Circuit (成德, headquartered in modern Shijiazhuang, Hebei, also known as Zhao) early in the Chinese Five Dynasties and Ten Kingdoms period.  His father Zhang Wenli had taken over the circuit after a mutiny that Zhang Wenli encouraged resulted in the death of Zhang Wenli's adoptive father Wang Rong the Prince of Zhao in 921.  Zhang Wenli subsequently died during the campaign waged by Wang Rong's ally Li Cunxu the Prince of Jin to avenge Wang Rong.  Zhang Chujin took over the leadership of the circuit after Zhang Wenli's death and tried to hold out against Jin forces, but was captured and killed in 922.

Background 
It is not known when or where Zhang Chujin was born.  His father Zhang Wenli had been an army officer at Lulong Circuit (盧龍, headquartered in modern Beijing), but at one point fled to Chengde Circuit and was adopted by Wang Rong the military governor (Jiedushi) of Chengde, who changed his name to Wang Deming.  Zhang Chujin had at least two younger brothers, Zhang Chuqiu and Zhang Chuqi.

In 921, Wang Rong was killed in a mutiny at Chengde (which was then known as Zhao as well, as Wang Rong carried the title of Prince of Zhao as its ruler), which Wang Deming had encouraged.  The mutineers offered governorship of the circuit to Wang Deming, who accepted, slaughtered Wang Rong's family, and changed his name back to Zhang Wenli.  Initially, Wang Rong's ally Li Cunxu the Prince of Jin, not wanting to create a new enemy, commissioned Zhang as the acting military governor, but after urging by Wang Rong's former subordinate Fu Xi (who had been commanding Zhao troops that Wang Rong sent to assist Li Cunxu in his campaigns) and after discovering that Zhang had been communicating with Zhu Zhen the emperor of Jin's archenemy Later Liang and Khitan's Emperor Taizu, launched a general campaign against Zhang, with his generals Yan Bao and Shi Jiantang commanding the Jin troops and Fu commanding the Zhao troops.  When the combined Jin/Zhao troops captured Zhao Prefecture (趙州, in modern Shijiazhuang, Hebei) quickly, Zhang Wenli died in shock.  Zhang Chujin kept news of Zhang Wenli's death a secret and took over leadership, continuing to resist the Jin/Zhao troops.

As ruler of Chengde Circuit 
The Jin/Zhao troops quickly put Chengde's capital Zhen Prefecture under siege.  However, under Zhang Chujin and Zhang Chuqiu's leadership, the Chengde mutineers inflicted a number of unexpected losses on the forces Li Cunxu sent against them from fall 921 to fall 922, including:

 Killing Shi Jiantang in battle.
 Defeating Yan Bao and forcing his retreat.  (Yan subsequently died in shame.)
 Inflicting a mortal injury on Li Cunxu's well-regarded cousin Li Sizhao.
 Killing Li Cunxu's adoptive brother Li Cunjin in battle.

However, Later Liang refused to aid them. Wang Chuzhi failed to aid him before himself overthrown by his adoptive son Wang Du. Khitan's Emperor Taizu did try to do so, but after Li Cunxu himself intercepted Khitan troops and defeated them, Khitan troops withdrew as well, leaving the Chengde mutineers without aid.  When their food supplies ran out, Zhang Chujin sent emissaries to Li Cunxu, offering to surrender; Li Cunxu did not respond.  Soon thereafter, Li Cunxu's adoptive brother Li Cunshen arrived and continued the siege.  The city fell, and Zhang Chujin, his brothers, and Zhang Wenli's wife (it is unclear whether she was Zhang Chujin's mother or not) were all captured by Jin troops and delivered to Li Cunxu after their legs were first broken.  It appeared that they were executed, for the people of Zhao requested to eat their flesh.

Notes and references 

922 deaths
Zhao (Five Dynasties period) people
Executed Jin (Later Tang precursor) people
Five Dynasties and Ten Kingdoms generals
People executed by Jin (Later Tang precursor)
Year of birth unknown